Benjamin Burnside Pelham (1862–1948) was an American lawyer, accountant, political organizer, journalist, and newspaper publisher.

Biography 
Benjamin Burnside Pelham was born on February 7, 1862 in Detroit, Michigan. He attended Everett School in Detroit, followed by Detroit High School. 

He was a journalist and edited the newspapers The Venture and Detroit Plaindealer. He served as president of the county's Board of Supervisors and was one of the most powerful African American politicians in the United States during the early 1900s. Aris A. Mallas wrote Forty Years in Politics - The Story of Ben Pelham (Wayne State University Press, 1957) about him.

References

1862 births
1948 deaths
County officials in Michigan
Editors of Michigan newspapers
African-American people in Michigan politics
Politicians from Detroit
20th-century American newspaper publishers (people)
19th-century American newspaper editors
19th-century American newspaper publishers (people)
20th-century American newspaper editors
Lawyers from Detroit
20th-century American politicians
African-American journalists